Ulrich Reinhold Østergaard (born 19 April 1981 in Odense, Denmark) is a Danish former speedway rider.

Career
Østergaard initially came to the United Kingdom for a trial with the Trelawny Tigers in 2002 and impressed the management as they offered a contract immediately. However the BSPA did not ratify the deal due to the complex points limit in operation that season. Østergaard was eventually signed by the Eastbourne Eagles to ride in the ill-fated British League Cup during 2003. The 2004 season saw Østergaard gain his first full-time UK ride with the Isle of Wight Islanders, where he stayed for two seasons, doubling up with the Eastbourne Eagles in the Elite League. In 2006 he was signed by the Peterborough Panthers, winning the Elite League title. 2007 saw Østergaard step down a division to ride for the Birmingham Brummies, but after falling out with the management he signed for the Workington Comets.

Østergaard signed for the Reading Racers in 2008 for the start of their new season back in the Premier League after a two-year stint in the Elite League. He started the season with an average of 8.27, filling the number three spot on the Racers line up. By the end of the season, he had topped Reading's averages with a 10.33 figure. He was also named 2008 Premier League Rider of the Year by the Speedway Riders Association.

Having started the 2019 season as Birmingham Brummies number 1 rider he was dropped by the Midlands team and quickly re-signed for former team Redcar Bears.

As of 2021, he rode in the top tier of British Speedway, riding for the Peterborough Panthers in the SGB Premiership 2021, in addition to the Glasgow Tigers in the SGB Championship 2021. He was involved in a serious crash in July 2021 breaking bones in his back and wrist.

In 2022, he rode for the Peterborough in the SGB Premiership 2022 and for the Glasgow in the SGB Championship 2022.

In November 2022, he announced his retirement from competitive racing and an intention to manage a team in Denmark.

References 

1981 births
Living people
Danish speedway riders
Birmingham Brummies riders
Glasgow Tigers riders
Isle of Wight Islanders riders
Peterborough Panthers riders
Reading Racers riders
Workington Comets riders
Sportspeople from Odense